Seaplane Point is a point at the south side of Curtiss Bay, on the northeast coast of Chavdar Peninsula on Davis Coast, Graham Land. Mapped from air photos taken by Hunting Aerosurveys (1955–57). Named by United Kingdom Antarctic Place-Names Committee (UK-APC) in association with Curtiss Bay; Glenn Curtiss, after whom the bay is named, pioneered seaplanes from 1911 onward.

Map

 British Antarctic Territory.  Scale 1:200000 topographic map. DOS 610 Series, Sheet W 64 60.  Directorate of Overseas Surveys, Tolworth, UK, 1978.

References
 SCAR Composite Gazetteer of Antarctica.

Headlands of Graham Land
Davis Coast